The Jakismani monastery (jak'ismanis monasteri, also spelled Jaqismani) is a medieval monastic church in Georgia, some  southwest of the town of Vale, Akhaltsikhe Municipality, Samtskhe-Javakheti region. It was repopulated by monks in 2010. The name "Jakismani" is a corruption of the Georgian "Jakisubani" (ჯაყისუბანი), "a district of Jaki".

The Jakismani monastery is located in the historical province of Samtskhe, within the Georgian-Turkish border zone. It is accessible through a poor road only after crossing the Georgian border checkpoint. The monastery consists of a main church, named after Resurrection, two small chapels (one of them possibly  a pastophorium, i.e., a chamber to the side of the apse), and a ruined narthex. The main church is a refined hall church design, architecturally dated to the 9th or 10th century and stylistically resembling features of the churches in Javakheti and Tao-Klarjeti. Close to the monastery, in the Potskhovi valley, stand the ruins identified with the medieval Jaki castle, a possession of the Jakeli dynasty. In 2006, the Jakismani monastery was inscribed on the list of the Immovable Cultural Monuments of National Significance of Georgia.

Notes

References 

Buildings and structures in Samtskhe–Javakheti
Churches in Georgia (country)
Immovable Cultural Monuments of National Significance of Georgia